There are at least 26 named lakes and reservoirs in Yell County, Arkansas.

Lakes
 Buckman Lake, el.  
 Cowger Lake, el.  
 Gibson Lake, el.  
 Horseshoe Lake, el.  
 Keeland Lake, el.  
 Luther Lake, el.  
 Mason Lake, el.  
 Open Slough, el.  
 Peeler Lake, el.  
 Peter George Lake, el.  
 Rose Lake, el.  
 Surrounded Ridges Lake, el.

Reservoirs
 Bailey Branch Lake, el.  
 Blue Mountain Lake, el.  
 Bogs Lake, el.  
 Cedar-Piney Lake, el.  
 Chambers Lake, el.  
 Harris Fish Farm Reservoir, el.  
 Kingfisher Lake, el.  
 Lake Ola, el.  
 Lake Ola-dale, el.  
 Mockingbird Hill Lake, el.  
 Nimrod Lake, el.  
 Pullen Pond, el.  
 Schoonover Lake, el.  
 Spring Lake, el.

See also
 List of lakes in Arkansas

Notes

Bodies of water of Yell County, Arkansas
Yell